Zevallos is a surname. Notable people with the surname include:

Antonieta Zevallos de Prialé (1918/1919–2006), Peruvian politician
Claudia Ortiz De Zevallos (born 1981), Peruvian model
Fernando Zevallos (born 1957), Peruvian businessman
Jaime Zevallos, Peruvian-American actor and writer
Juan Zevallos (born 1990), Peruvian footballer
Mariano Herencia Zevallos (1820–1884), Peruvian politician